Seoul Cycling Team is a South Korean UCI Continental cycling team established in 2008.

Team roster

Major wins
2010
Stages 3 & 5 Tour de Korea, Seon Ho Park
Stages 6 & 9 Tour de Korea, Hyo Suk Gong
2011
Stages 3, 4 & 6 Tour of Thailand, Ho Sung Cho
2012
Stage 5 Tour of Thailand, Joon Yong Seo
2013
Stages 3 & 5 Tour of Thailand, Ho Sung Cho
Stage 7 Tour de Korea, Ho Sung Cho
2014
Stage 2 Tour de Korea, Jun-oh Kwon
Stage 4 Tour of Thailand, Ki Seok Lee
2015
Asian Continental U23 Time Trial championships, Sang-hoon Park
2016
Stage 6 Tour of Thailand, Ok Cheol Kim
Stage 2 Tour of Fuzhou, Ok Cheol Kim
2017
Overall Tour de Korea Kyeongho Min
Young rider classification Kyeongho Min
Stage 2, Kyeongho Min

References

External links

UCI Continental Teams (Asia)
Cycling teams established in 2008
Cycling teams based in South Korea